Stephen Sprouse (September 12, 1953 – March 4, 2004) was an American fashion designer and artist credited with pioneering the 1980s mix of "uptown sophistication in clothing with a downtown punk and pop sensibility".

Career
Stephen Sprouse's initial Day-Glo bright, sixties-inspired, graffiti-printed fashion collections for men and women caught the attention of fashion editors, store buyers, and fashionistas, garnering much media coverage. His initial collections (1983–1985) were huge critical hits, sold at only the "best" stores (his 1983 collections were sold exclusively at Bergdorf Goodman and Henri Bendel in New York City on a small scale). To much surprise in the fashion and retail communities, Sprouse declared bankruptcy in June 1985 (even though his base of influential fashion editors and high-end stores were firmly in place).  Sprouse cited production, late deliveries, and financial problems in an interview with Women's Wear Daily shortly after he closed his initial business.

Sprouse informally showed a Fall 1985 collection to buyers and the press at his new showroom in Union Square on Broadway - the last location of Andy Warhol's infamous "Factory" lofts.  A runway presentation at Club USA in NYC was initially planned (and largely promoted) for its grand opening.  Subsequently, the show was cancelled; a Stephen Sprouse Incorporated representative stated at the time that the show was cancelled due to the company relocating to their new Union Square location.  The apparel shown were "finished samples."

Sprouse referred to his Fall 1985 collection as being "more hippie weird" and early seventies-inspired, with bell-bottom trousers, psychedelic prints, and maxi skirts, but the company lacked the funds and staff to produce the apparel.

Sprouse was initially noted by fashion magazines and retailers for using high-quality, expensive, custom-dyed fabrics (his woolens were largely sourced by the high-end Italian textile house Agnona).  Sprouse personally did the graffiti that adorned many of his very early, expensive garments (1983, early 1984), which added to their desirability.

In September 1987, with financial backing from high-end furniture manufacturer Knoll International (then known as GFI/General Felt Industries), Sprouse opened a three-level store on Wooster Street in New York City; a second (smaller) store was opened in Los Angeles in the spring of 1988 at the Beverly Center shopping complex.  He partly abandoned his signature sixties silhouettes, instead drawing inspiration from the mid-seventies London-based punk rock scene. For his Fall 1987 and Spring 1988 collections, he was given permission to use one of Andy Warhol's "Camouflage" screen-prints to utilize as textile designs (Sprouse created a secondary print, based on Warhol's original). For his Fall 1988 "Signature" collection, he collaborated with artist Keith Haring to create several abstract prints of Jesus with graffiti, and Haring's "squibbles." His company, CSI ({Andrew} Cogan Sprouse Incorporated) also wholesaled the various collections ("Stephen Sprouse," "Sprouse," and "S") to retailers (commencing with his Spring 1988 collection), but he lost his financial backing due to poor sales and production/quality issues, closing again in December 1988, shortly after the company shipped their "Holiday" line.

In 1992, Sprouse designed an exclusive men's and women's "capsule collection" (i.e.: 32 pieces in whole) for Bergdorf Goodman, dubbed "CyberPunk," which featured Velcro in lieu of traditional buttons. Sprouse (again) largely sourced custom made textiles from Agnona for his fall 1992 collection.  The production of the collection was done entirely on a couture level, leading to extremely high-priced garments (e.g.: $500 for a pair of men's nylon underwear - that being one of the lowest priced items available).  Bergdorf Goodman sold the line for two seasons (Fall 1992 & Spring 1993), with very limited success, despite wide media coverage, and featuring Sprouse's garments in their window displays.

Sprouse showed a collection ("CyberGlitter") at Club USA in NYC for Fall 1993, but it never went into full production, despite orders being placed from retail buyers.

In 1995, Barneys New York handled the production of an exclusive women's spring/summer line. Vogue magazine featured the moderately priced garments in its pages, but it sold poorly.  That same year, Sprouse also served as the costume curator for the new Rock and Roll Hall of Fame in Cleveland, and designed the staff's uniforms.

In 1996, Sprouse designed the logo and cover for New York Glam outfit Psychotica's self-titled album, released under American records.
In 1998, with full production and backing from Italian manufacturer Staff International, he was briefly back in business, but the clothes sold poorly and were largely ignored by the fashion press and retailers that adored him in the 1980s.

Despite such ups and downs, Sprouse's apparel is still coveted - his clothing continues to fetch high prices in vintage stores and online (e.g.: eBay) for his most iconic pieces.

The graffiti logo bags he designed in collaboration with Marc Jacobs for Louis Vuitton in 2001 made the fashion world take notice once again.

In 2002, he created a vast collection of men's and women's apparel, home accessories, sports gear, etc. for the Target discount chain (dubbed "AmericaLand") - mostly rendered in a graffiti patriotic motif.

In 2003, Sprouse collaborated with fashion brand Diesel on a take over of its Union Square Store for September's New York Fashion Week. As part of the collaboration, Sprouse designed a series of limited edition jeans, T-shirts and hats, and made a complete makeover of the Diesel store, which meant adding his renowned Day-Glo design to windows, interiors, and outer building exteriors. At the launch of the event Diesel’s founder and President, Renzo Rosso, explained the project as "first and foremost a tribute that we wish to pay to one of the most groundbreaking and far-reaching artists of our time, someone who went beyond categorizations, means of expressions, and gender- a common approach at Diesel."

For both Fall 2006 and 2008, Marc Jacobs utilized Sprouse's 1987 graffiti leopard images for handbags, shoes, and scarves for Louis Vuitton, which sold-out instantly.

Sprouse designed clothes for Blondie's Debbie Harry (his one-time downstairs neighbor in the Bowery section of NYC) in the late 70s/early 80s, prior to becoming a commercial designer.  Sprouse worked extensively with the band Duran Duran in the late 1980s, designing the clothes for their 1989 tour for the album Big Thing, as well as the cover for their greatest hits album Decade of the same year.  Additionally, he styled and dressed Billy Idol in the early 1990s for Idol's "comeback" (which garnered little interest).

Sprouse launched himself as a commercial fashion designer when he competed in a fashion show contest of young designers in the spring of 1983 (at the suggestion of photographer and friend Steven Meisel), sponsored by the Polaroid Corporation (he previously worked as a design assistant to Halston in the 1970s for three years). Based upon the favorable editorial reaction he received, he soon after formed his first company, Stephen Sprouse, Inc., and set up a showroom and production space at 57th Street and Fifth Avenue, launching his initial commercial collections for retail (prior to this, production of his early 1983 apparel, done on a small scale, was produced by Dianne Phelp's company "Triad").

Sprouse soon formed an in-house production staff for the small runway collection he showed in his silver-painted showroom (in homage to the Andy Warhol Factory loft of the sixties) in December 1983.  The show garnered much attention and favorable reviews (notably from The New York Times Fashion Editor, John Duka).  Sprouse's subsequent runway show, held at the NYC club The Ritz in May 2004 was the "must see" show of the season.

Financial backing was provided by his parents, Norbert and Joanne Sprouse, for Sprouse's initial business.

Sprouse died at St. Luke's-Roosevelt Hospital Center in New York City of heart failure, after a closely guarded diagnosis of lung cancer a year before. He was 50.

A book on the career of Sprouse, The Stephen Sprouse Book, by Roger Padilha and Mauricio Padilha (with a foreword by Tama Janowitz), was released by Rizzoli on January 13, 2009.

In July 2022, an exhibition titled "Stephen Sprouse: Rock, Art, Fashion" opened at the Indianapolis Museum of Art.

See also

 Andy Warhol
 Keith Haring
 Duran Duran

References

External links
The Stephen Sprouse Book
Marc Jacobs tribute to Stephen Sprouse
New York Times, March 5, 2004 "Stephen Sprouse, Design Pioneer, Dies at 50", by William Norwich
Obituary in Traverse City Record Eagle, his Michigan home town newspaper
Deborah Harry of Blondie wearing a Stephen Sprouse creation
Interview with some of Stephen Sprouse biggest collectors in the US

1953 births
2004 deaths
American fashion designers
LGBT fashion designers
American LGBT artists
Artists from Dayton, Ohio
20th-century American LGBT people